The 1940–41 Kansas Jayhawks men's basketball team represented the University of Kansas during the 1940–41 college men's basketball season.

Roster
Robert Allen
James Arnold
John Buescher
Howard Engleman
Edward Hall
Vance Hall
Thomas Hunter
John Kline
Norman Sanneman
Marvin Sollenberger
Charles Walker

Schedule

References

Kansas Jayhawks men's basketball seasons
Kansas
Kansas
Kansas